Massimilla Doni is a 1935 German-language opera by Othmar Schoeck based on the story by Balzac.

Recording
 Massimilla Doni Hermann Winkler (Duke Cattaneo); Harald Stamm (Capraja); Josef  Protschka (Memmi); Roland Hermann (Prince Vendramin); Massimilla  Doni (Edith Mathis). Kölner RSO and Choir/Gerd Albrecht   CD1: 56:05  CD2: 71:17 127:22 Recorded January 1986 Koch Schwann CD314 025 K3

References

Operas
1935 operas
Operas by Othmar Schoeck
Adaptations of works by Honoré de Balzac